The UK Singles Sales Chart is a weekly record chart compiled by the Official Charts Company (OCC) on behalf of the British record industry. The UK Singles Sales Chart differs from the UK Singles Chart (also known as the Official Singles Chart) in that it counts "physical" sales only (including downloads), whereas the Official Chart also counts streaming. Since 10 July 2015, the chart week has run from Friday to Thursday with the chart-date given as the following Thursday; prior to this, the chart week ran from Sunday to Saturday, with the chart date given as the following Saturday.

It was announced in June 2014 that as of Sunday, 29 June, audio streams from streaming media services would be counted towards the Official Singles Chart to better reflect changes in music consumption in the United Kingdom after a year-on-year doubling from 100 million to 200 million weekly streams from the previous year. The UK  Singles Sales Chart uses the previous methodology, and as a result did not face the criticism the UK Singles Chart faced in 2016 when there were no new entries in the top 49 and in 2017 when Ed Sheeran's ÷ occupied sixteen of the top twenty places in the chart.

As of 17 April 2020, "Sorry" by Justin Bieber; "Wild Thoughts" by DJ Khaled featuring Rihanna and Bryson Tiller; "Feels" by Calvin Harris featuring Pharrell Williams, Katy Perry & Big Sean; "New Rules" by Dua Lipa, "Rockstar" by Post Malone featuring 21 Savage, "God's Plan" by Drake; "Freaky Friday" by Lil Dicky featuring Chris Brown, "Nice for What" by Drake, "Eastside" by Benny Blanco, Halsey and Khalid, "Funky Friday" by Dave featuring Fredo, "Break Up with Your Girlfriend, I'm Bored" by Ariana Grande, "Vossi Bop" by Stormzy, "Beautiful People" by Ed Sheeran featuring Khalid, "Take Me Back to London" by Ed Sheeran featuring Stormzy, "River" by Ellie Goulding, "Own It" by Stormzy featuring Ed Sheeran and Burna Boy, "Godzilla" by Eminem featuring Juice Wrld and "Roses" by Saint Jhn have topped the UK Singles Chart but not the UK Singles Sales Chart. Those which have topped the UK Singles Sales Chart but not the UK Singles Chart have been noted. The addition of streaming to the Official Chart led to fewer new songs entering the chart and fewer chart toppers.

Number-one singles

Notes

References

UK Singles Chart number-one singles